The following is a list of people who have attained admiral rank within the Namibian Navy (NN).

Key

The ranks of Flag Officers changed in 2007 when the rank previously called Commodore became known as Rear Admiral (Junior Grade).

References

Admirals
Lists of admirals
Admirals